Blues for Myself is an album by pianist Tete Montoliu recorded in 1977 and originally released on the Spanish label, Ensayo.

Reception

Ken Dryden of AllMusic said "The blind Catalonian pianist Tete Montoliu is in great form on this 1977 session recorded in Spain ... this disc is worth acquiring".

Track listing
All compositions by Tete Montoliu except where noted.
 "Blues for Corien" – 5:05
 "You've Changed" (Bill Carey, Carl T. Fischer) – 7:30
 "It Could Happen to You" (Jimmy Van Heusen, Johnny Burke) – 6:05
 "Blues for Myself" – 6:10
 "Jimmy's Tempo" (Jimmy Heath) – 5:10
 "Blues for Llorach" – 5:55
 "Blues for Coltrane" – 3:50

Personnel
Tete Montoliu – piano
Erik Peter – bass 
Peer Wyboris – drums

References

Tete Montoliu albums
1977 albums